Beyt-e Kavar (also Romanized as Beyt-e Kavār; also known as Beyt-e Gavvār) is a village in Neysan Rural District, Neysan District, Hoveyzeh County, Khuzestan Province, Iran. At the 2006 census, its population was 213, in 31 families.

References 

Populated places in Hoveyzeh County